Suffering Man's Charity, later released as Ghost Writer, is a 2007 comedy/horror film directed by Alan Cumming, written by playwright Thomas Gallagher, and starring Alan Cumming and David Boreanaz.

Plot
John, an eccentric music teacher, takes in Sebastian, a younger writer, ostensibly in an effort to help him, but is really attracted to him.  When Sebastian starts dating a woman and it becomes serious, John starts a fight that ultimately results in Sebastian's accidental death.  John then finds the manuscript of Sebastian's surprising, unpublished book and decides to publish it as his own.

Cast
Alan Cumming as John Vandermark
David Boreanaz as Sebastian St. Germain
Anne Heche as Helen Jacobsen
Henry Thomas as Eric Rykell
Karen Black as Renee
Jane Lynch as Ingrid Sorensen
Carrie Fisher as Reporter
Maria-Elena Laas as Liliana
Rachelle Lefevre as Elaine
Ermahn Ospina as Pedro
Alison Guh as Evelyn

External links

2007 direct-to-video films
American LGBT-related films
Films directed by Alan Cumming
2007 comedy horror films
2007 horror films
American comedy horror films
LGBT-related comedy horror films
2007 films
Films scored by Paul Cantelon
Ghostwriting in fiction
2007 comedy films
2007 LGBT-related films
2000s American films